Zinchenko is a Ukrainian surname. Notable people with the surname include:

 Anatoli Zinchenko (born 1949), Soviet-Russian footballer and coach
 David Zinczenko (born 1969), American magazine editor
 Fedor Zinchenko (1902–1991), Soviet-Ukrainian military officer
 Natalia Zinchenko (born 1979), Ukrainian footballer
 Pyotr Zinchenko (1903–1969), Soviet-Ukrainian psychologist
 Oleksandr Zinchenko (1957–2010), Ukrainian politician
 Oleksandr Zinchenko (born 1996), Ukrainian footballer
 Vladimir Zinchenko (born 1959), Ukrainian discus thrower

See also
 

Ukrainian-language surnames